Pozdnyakovo is a rural locality (a village) in Oktyabrskoye Rural Settlement, Vyaznikovsky District, Vladimir Oblast, Russia. The population was 160 as of 2010.

Geography 
Pozdnyakovo is located 30 km west from Vyazniki (the district's administrative centre) by road. Ponomaryovo is the nearest rural locality.

References 

Rural localities in Vyaznikovsky District